Gregory Andrés Saavedra Morales (born 11 February 1989) was a Chilean footballer. His last club was Deportes Pintana in the Segunda División Profesional de Chile.

International career
Along with Chile U18 he won the 2008 João Havelange Tournament and also represented Chile U23 at the 2008 Inter Continental Cup in Malaysia.

In 2009, he represented Chile U20 at the 2009 South American U-20 Championship.

Honours

Club
Trasandino
 Tercera A (1): 2012

International
Chile U18
 João Havelange Tournament (1): 2008

References

External links
 
 

1989 births
Living people
People from Santiago
Chilean footballers
Chile under-20 international footballers
Chile youth international footballers
Unión Española footballers
Deportes Temuco footballers
Trasandino footballers
A.C. Barnechea footballers
Deportes Melipilla footballers
Municipal La Pintana footballers
Segunda División Profesional de Chile players
Primera B de Chile players
Chilean Primera División players
Association football goalkeepers
Footballers from Santiago